Smoking is the inhaling of smoke generated for this purpose from various substances, most often tobacco.

It may take the form of:
 Pipe smoking
 Tobacco smoking
 Cannabis smoking

It may also refer to:
 Smoking (cooking), treating food by exposing it to smoke
 Smoking (rolling paper), a brand of rolling papers
 Smoking jacket, a waist-length men's jacket made of silk or velvet traditionally worn for smoking or leisure at home
 In parts of Europe and Brazil, "smoking" refers to a tuxedo (dinner jacket)

See also 
Smokin' (disambiguation)
Smoking/No Smoking, a 1993 French movie, winner of the César Award for Best Film
Smoke, the airborne solid and liquid particulates and gases evolved when a material undergoes pyrolysis or combustion
Smoker (disambiguation)
Smoking concert

no:Røyking